Mosonmagyaróvári Torna Egylet are a Hungarian association football club from the town of Mosonmagyaróvár.

History
Mosonmagyaróvári TE debuted in the 2016–17 Nemzeti Bajnokság II season of the Hungarian League.

First team squad 
As of 5 August, 2022.

Managers
 József Király

References

External links
 Official website of the club
 Profile on Magyar Futball

Football clubs in Hungary
1904 establishments in Hungary
Association football clubs established in 1904
Mosonmagyaróvár